Eliyahu Moshe Panigel (1850–1919) was the Sephardi chief rabbi of the Ottoman Empire, Palestine and Jerusalem.

Orphaned at a young age, Panigel was brought up by his uncle Raphael Meir Panigel, the rishon le-Zion (Sephardi chief rabbi of Palestine). He was sent to Algeria to collect funds for the Misgav Ladach Hospital in Jerusalem and to North Africa, Italy, India, the Caucasus and Bokhara, by the Jerusalem community. After the death of Jacob Saul Elyashar in 1906, a dispute arose within the community as to who should be appointed his successor. The more modern members supported Jacob Meir while the more traditional supported Chaim Moses Elyashar. Meir assumed the position for a few months before he was deposed by the Sultan of Turkey. In 1907 Panigel was chosen as hacham bashi and rishon le-Zion but he was forced to resign 1908. Rabbi Nachman Batito subsequently served as deputy chief rabbi from 1909 to 1911, whereupon Rabbi Moses Franco of Rhodes was appointed chief rabbi until 1915. When Jerusalem was captured by the British in 1917, Panigel publicly welcomed General Allenby and the Jewish Legion.

References

Rishon LeZion (rabbi)
20th-century rabbis from the Ottoman Empire
Sephardi rabbis in Ottoman Palestine
1850 births
1919 deaths